Diocese of Concepción may refer to the following ecclesiastical jurisdictions:
 Roman Catholic Diocese of Concepción, Argentina
 Roman Catholic Archdiocese of Concepción, Chile
 Anglican Diocese of Concepción in Chile
 Roman Catholic Diocese of Concepción en Paraguay, in Paraguay